

Q
 QC   - Quebec Central Railway
 QCCX - Quantum Chemical Corporation
 QGRY - Quebec Gatineau Railway
 QNSX - Rail Enterprises Inc. (Doing Business As: Quebec North Shore and Labrador Railway on behalf of Iron Ore Company of Canada)
 QOCX - GE Rail Services
 QOHX - Quaker Oats Company
 QOTX - Quaker Oats Company (Chemicals Division)
 QRR  - Quincy Railroad
 QSMX - Quaker State Oil Refining Corporation
 QSOX - Quaker State Oil Refining Corporation
 QTTX - TTX Corporation

Q